Pseudocalotes ziegleri, Ziegler's tree lizard,  is a species of agamid lizard. It is endemic to Vietnam.

References

Pseudocalotes
Reptiles of Vietnam
Reptiles described in 2010
Taxa named by Jakob Hallermann
Taxa named by Nikolai Loutseranovitch Orlov
Taxa named by Natalia B. Ananjeva